Mihkel (Icelandic: Undir Halastjörnu) is a 2018 Icelandic-Estonian film directed by Ari Alexander Ergis Magnússon. It is based on true events from a 2004 criminal case in Iceland where a body was discovered by a chance by a diver in the Neskaupstaður harbor.

The film stars Icelanders Tómas Lemarquis and Atli Rafn Sigurðsson, and Estonians Pääru Oja as Mihkel and Kaspar Velberg as Igor. It premiered in Iceland on 12 October 2018.

Cast
 Tómas Lemarquis – Bóbó
 Pääru Oja – Mihkel
 Atli Rafn Sigurðsson – Jóhann
 Kaspar Velberg– Igor
 Maiken Schmidt - Veera
 Greete-Elena Priisalu – Väike Veera
 Marko Matvere – Mihkel's father
 Maarja Jakobson – Mihkel's mother
 Ivo Uukkivi – Igor's father
 Atli Rafn Sigurðsson – Johann
 Rein Oja – Pastor
 Kristjan Sarv – Assistant pastor
 Þrúður Vilhjálmsdóttir – Doctor
 Heiddis Chadwick Hlynsdottir – Barbara Girl

References

External links

Mihkel at Icelandic Film Centre
2018 films
Icelandic drama films
2000s Icelandic-language films
Norwegian crime drama films
Estonian drama films